Paul Walter Hauser (born October 15, 1986) is an American actor and comedian. He is known for his supporting roles in the films Cruella, I, Tonya, Late Night, BlacKkKlansman, and Da 5 Bloods. In 2019, Hauser had his breakout performance as the title character in the film Richard Jewell, leading the National Board of Review to award him for best Breakthrough Performance. He starred as suspected serial killer Larry Hall in the 2022 miniseries Black Bird, and was also seen in the TV show Kingdom. For his role in Black Bird, he won a Critics' Choice Television Award and a Golden Globe Award.

Life and career
Hauser was born in Grand Rapids, Michigan, and raised in Saginaw, Michigan. His parents are Deborah and The Rev. Paul Hauser, a Lutheran minister. He attended Valley Lutheran High School, a private parochial school in Saginaw.

Hauser portrayed Shawn Eckhardt in the 2017 film I, Tonya, Dale in the 2010 film Virginia, and Keith in the television series Kingdom. He had the recurring role of Deshawn in the Amazon web series Betas, and in 2018 appeared as Lonnie Laloush in Super Troopers 2 and as Ivanhoe in BlacKkKlansman. He has also appeared as a guest star on the television series Unbreakable Kimmy Schmidt, The Night Shift, Superstore, Key & Peele, It's Always Sunny in Philadelphia, Community, Blunt Talk, and Cobra Kai. In 2019, he starred in Clint Eastwood's Richard Jewell, portraying the title role, Richard Jewell, the real life security guard who spotted the bomb at the Centennial Olympic Park bombing. In 2020, he starred in Songbird, a film based on the COVID-19 pandemic.  

In 2021, Hauser played Horace Badun in the crime comedy-drama Cruella, a Disney live-action prequel/spin-off of One Hundred and One Dalmatians.

Hauser also stars as Raymond Porter, better known by his nickname Stingray, in Cobra Kai. He plays a recurring character in Season 2, and a major anti-hero in Seasons 4 & 5. 

Although known for his comedic turns, Hauser gained broad recognition and critical praise for his portrayal of the serial killer Larry Hall in the 2022 Apple TV+ true crime miniseries Black Bird. Critic Nick Schager wrote of Hauser's performance, "even in a sea of maniacal villains, his Larry Hall stands out as a uniquely cunning madman, so unpredictable and unnerving as to be downright unforgettable."

Personal life
He married Amy Elizabeth Boland on July 23, 2020, in Los Angeles. Hauser and Boland have a son, who was born on April 21, 2021, in Thomasville, Georgia. Their son was in his first movie, Bandit, when he was just 5 weeks old. On January 11, 2023 (Golden Globe Awards) during his acceptance speech, he announced he and his wife were expecting their second son.

Filmography

Film

Television

Accolades

References

External links
 

1986 births
American Christians
Living people
21st-century American male actors
American male comedians
Male actors from Michigan
American male film actors
Film producers from Michigan
American male television actors
American male voice actors
Best Supporting Actor Golden Globe (television) winners
Male actors from Grand Rapids, Michigan
People from Saginaw, Michigan